The Revolution of the Lances (Revolución de las Lanzas) occurred in Uruguay from September 12, 1870 to April 6, 1872.

Parties
Led by Timoteo Aparicio, leader of the National Party of Uruguay (the Blancos) and a former army officer, it was named after the tacuara, an improvised weapon used by South American militias, consisting of a knife tied to a stalk of cane similar to bambu, resulting in a rudimentary lance.

Resolution
The series of events ended with a power-sharing agreement between the Blanco and the Colorado Parties.  

The agreement in one form or another was to last until the early 20th century, when the Blanco forces were defeated at the Battle of Masoller in 1904.

Battles
Battle of Paso Severino
Battle of Corralito
Taking of the Fortaleza del Cerro (Toma de la Fortaleza del Cerro)
Battle of Sauce (1870)
Battle of Manantiales (July 17, 1871)
Battle of Paso de los Loros de Arroyo Grande

See also

 Uruguayan Civil War#Later conflicts

Wars involving Uruguay
History of Uruguay
1870 in Uruguay
1871 in Uruguay
1872 in Uruguay
Conflicts in 1870
Conflicts in 1871
Conflicts in 1873
Civil wars involving the states and peoples of South America
19th-century revolutions